Petar Yanev (born 3 September 1945) is a Bulgarian weightlifter. He competed in the men's featherweight event at the 1968 Summer Olympics.

References

1945 births
Living people
Bulgarian male weightlifters
Olympic weightlifters of Bulgaria
Weightlifters at the 1968 Summer Olympics
Sportspeople from Novi Pazar
World Weightlifting Championships medalists